Andrés Mbuamangongo Malango Dyombe (19 December 1974) is an Equatorial Guinean former footballer who played as a forward. He represented the Equatorial Guinea national team.

Early life
Malango was born in Los Angeles, California, United States as a result of diplomatic work of his father. He moved with his family to Mozambique for two years and returned later to Equatorial Guinea, where Malango spent his infancy. Being a teenager, he emigrated to Spain.

Club career
Malango played in the Spanish Segunda División B for Real Aranjuez.

International career
On 8 June 2003 Malango played for Equatorial Guinea, scoring the last in a 2-1 win against Gabon at the 2004 Africa Cup of Nations qualifiers. Later that year, he was substitute in both FIFA World Cup qualifying matches against Togo but did not appear.

International goals

Personal life
Malango, who has studied psychology and worked in JPMorgan Chase, lives nowadays in Manhattan, New York. His brothers, Donato and Thomas, also were footballers.

Statistics

International

References

External links
 
 

1974 births
Living people
Citizens of Equatorial Guinea through descent
Equatoguinean footballers
Association football forwards
Segunda División B players
Tercera División players
Divisiones Regionales de Fútbol players
Equatorial Guinea international footballers
Equatoguinean expatriate footballers
Equatoguinean expatriate sportspeople in Spain
Expatriate footballers in Spain
Soccer players from Los Angeles
American soccer players
African-American soccer players
American people of Equatoguinean descent
American sportspeople of African descent
Sportspeople of Equatoguinean descent
American expatriate soccer players
American expatriate sportspeople in Spain
20th-century African-American sportspeople